Social ecology studies relationships between people and their environment, often the interdependence of people, collectives and institutions. Evolving out of biological ecology, human ecology, systems theory and ecological psychology, social ecology takes a “broad, interdisciplinary perspective that gives greater attention to the social, psychological, institutional, and cultural contexts of people-environment relations than did earlier versions of human ecology.” The concept has been employed to study a diverse array of social problems and policies within the behavioural and social sciences.

Conceptual orientation 

As described by Stokols, the core principles of social ecology include:

 Multidimensional structure of human environments—physical & social, natural & built features; objective-material as well as perceived-symbolic (or semiotic); virtual & place-based features
 Cross-disciplinary, multi-level, contextual analyses of people-environment relationships spanning proximal and distal scales (from narrow to broad spatial, sociocultural, and temporal scope)
 Systems principles, especially feedback loops, interdependence of system elements, anticipating unintended side effects of public policies and environmental interventions
 Translation of theory and research findings into community interventions and public policies
 Privileging and combining both academic and non-academic perspectives, including scientists and academicians, lay citizens and community stakeholder groups, business leaders and other professional groups, and government decision makers.
 Transdisciplinary values and orientation, synthesizing concepts and methods from different fields that pertain to particular research topics.

Academic programs 
Several academic programs combine a broad definition of “environmental studies” with analyses of social processes, biological considerations, and the physical environment. A number of social ecology degree-granting programs and research institutes shape the global evolution of the social ecological paradigm. For example, see:

 College of the Atlantic
 UC Irvine School of Social Ecology
 Yale School of Forestry & Environmental Studies 
 Cornell University College of Human Ecology
 New York University, Environmental Education
 The Institute for Social Ecology in Plainfield, VT
 The Institute for Social-Ecological Research, Frankfurt
 Institute of Social Ecology, Vienna
 Stockholm Resilience Centre

Most of the 120 listed programs at the link below are in human ecology, but many overlap with social ecology:
Society for Human Ecology list of programs and institutions

See also 
Social ecology (Bookchin)
Social ecological model
Ecology
Environmental stewardship

References

External links 
 Conceptual social ecology
  Google scholar search on social ecological systems
 Article on expansion of social ecological systems science